Waves are a hairstyle for curly hair in which the curls are brushed and/or combed and flattened out, creating a ripple-like pattern.

The hairstyle is achieved with a short-cropped haircut on top and frequent brushing and/or combing of the curls (which trains the curls to flatten out), as well as wearing a durag. Wave pomades and moisturizers can help hold the hair in place while preventing the hair from getting too dry. A durag is worn to preserve moisture while compressing the hair and holding it in place to create the desired waves.

In the early 20th century, as many African-American men sought to style their hair with texture-altering products, "pomade hair moisturizer" waves became a popular hairstyle. Men produced waves by washing and brushing their hair then putting on their durags right after putting on their choice of moisturizer.

See also
 List of hairstyles

References

External links
 
 

Hairstyles
African-American hair